Penicillium spirillum is an anamorph species of fungus in the genus Penicillium.

References

spirillum
Fungi described in 1980